The Vietnamese cutia (Cutia legalleni) is a bird species in the family Leiothrichidae. It is found in Laos and Vietnam.

It was long considered a subspecies of the Himalayan cutia (C. nipalensis), making the genus Cutia monotypic. In recent times, it is more often elevated to full species status.

Its natural habitat is tropical moist montane forests. The Vietnamese Cutia is not considered threatened by the IUCN, but as its range is far more restricted than that of its western relative, it is classified as a Near Threatened species after the split.

Footnotes

References
 BirdLife International (BLI) (2008a) Vietnamese Cutia Species Factsheet. Retrieved 2008-MAY-27.
 BirdLife International (BLI) (2008b): [2008 IUCN Redlist status changes]. Retrieved 2008-MAY-23.
 Collar, N.J. & Robson, Craig (2007): Family Timaliidae (Babblers). In: del Hoyo, Josep; Elliott, Andrew & Christie, D.A. (eds.): Handbook of Birds of the World, Volume 12 (Picathartes to Tits and Chickadees): 70-291. Lynx Edicions, Barcelona.

Vietnamese cutia
Birds of Vietnam
Vietnamese cutia